Joseph W. Chinnici (July 27, 1919 – March 18, 2007) was an American politician who served in the New Jersey General Assembly from the 1st Legislative District from 1972 to 1988.

A resident of Bridgeton, New Jersey while serving in the Assembly, Chinnici was born in the Rosenhayn section of Deerfield Township and graduated in 1938 from Bridgeton High School. He attended the Wharton School of the University of Pennsylvania.

Chinnici served on the Bridgeton city council and was a member of the Cumberland County Board of Chosen Freeholders before his election to the Assembly. He died on March 18, 2007, at age 87.

References

1919 births
2007 deaths
Bridgeton High School alumni
County commissioners in New Jersey
New Jersey city council members
Republican Party members of the New Jersey General Assembly
People from Bridgeton, New Jersey
People from Deerfield Township, New Jersey
Politicians from Cumberland County, New Jersey
Wharton School of the University of Pennsylvania alumni
20th-century American politicians